The men's C-2 500 metres event was an open-style, pairs canoeing event conducted as part of the Canoeing at the 1980 Summer Olympics program.

Medalists

Results

Heats
Eleven teams entered in two heats on July 30 though one withdrew prior to the heats. The top three finishers from each of the heats advanced directly to the final and the remaining four teams were relegated to the semifinal.

Semifinal
A semifinal was held on August 1. The top three finishers from the semifinal advanced to the final.

Final
The final was held on August 1.

References
1980 Summer Olympics official report Volume 3. p. 193. 
Sports-reference.com 1980 C-2 500 m results.

Men's C-2 500
Men's events at the 1980 Summer Olympics